"Thou shalt not kill" is one of the Ten Commandments.

Thou Shalt Not Kill may also refer to:

 "Thou Shalt Not Kill" (essay) (1900), an anti-war essay by Leo Tolstoy
 Thou Shalt Not Kill (1923 film), a German silent film
Thou Shalt Not Kill, a 1939 film directed by John H. Auer
"Thou Shalt Not Kill", a 1955 poem by Kenneth Rexroth
Thou Shalt Not Kill, a 1982 American television film starring Gary Graham
Dekalog: Five, a 1988 film by Krzysztof Kieślowski
Thou Shalt Not Kill, a 2001 film starring Steven Webb
"Thou Shalt Not Kill" (Spooks), the premiere episode of British TV series Spooks (2002)
Non uccidere, a 2015 Italian television series known as Thou Shalt Not Kill in English-speaking countries

See also
Thou Shalt Not Kill... Except, a 1985 American film